Manchioneal Airstrip  is an airstrip serving the Caribbean coastal town of Manchioneal in the Portland Parish of Jamaica.

There is gently rising terrain immediately to the northwest. East approach and departure are over the water.

See also

Transport in Jamaica
List of airports in Jamaica

References

External links
OpenStreetMap - Manchioneal
HERE Maps - Manchioneal Airstrip
FallingRain - Manchioneal Airstrip

Airports in Jamaica